Jamie Delgado and Jordan Kerr were the defending champions. Delgado chose not to compete this year, while Kerr partnered Fabrice Martin but they lost in the final to Colin Fleming and Jonathan Marray, 4–6, 6–2, [8–10].

Seeds

Draw

Draw

References
 Main Draw

American Express - TED Open - Doubles
2012 Doubles
2014 in Turkish tennis